Yeshiva Mercaz HaTorah of Belle Harbor (known colloquially in yeshiva circles as "Belle Harbor") is a residential high school and 3 year post high school for men founded in 1985 by Rabbi Chaim Zelikovitz and Rabbi Levi Dicker. It was led by Rabbi Levi Dicker for most of its history, until his passing in 2011. Rabbi Shmuel Zev Dicker and simcha gelber are the current Roshei haYeshiva.

Rabbi Levi Dicker was a close student of Rabbi Aharon Kotler, founder of Beth Medrash Govoha in Lakewood Township, New Jersey, and the yeshiva follows a similar approach to life and learning. The Yeshiva is located at 505 Beach 129th Street in Rockaway Park, Queens, on the Rockaway Peninsula. The Yeshiva offers a dual curriculum program for high school students, with a secular program offered in the afternoon, and Torah studies for the remainder of the day. The post high school program is a  full-time program in Torah studies. In Fall 2012, after Hurricane Sandy flooded Belle Harbor and the yeshiva campus, the Yeshiva temporarily relocated to Staten Island while the school facilities were pumped and repaired. The Yeshiva is known for its association with the crash of American Airlines Flight 587, which crashed on multiple sides of the Yeshiva. Belle Harbor's teachers in the Hebraics department are: 9th grade- Rabbi Tuvia Goldstein 10th grade- Rabbi Shua Aharon Marcus 11th grade- Rabbi Samsom Hirsch jr. 12th grade- HaRav HaGaon HaTzadik HaMekubal R' Shimon Zimmel Sorotzkin the son of R' Yitchok Sorotzkin author of Gevuras Yitzchok.

References

External links
Yeshiva Mercaz HaTorah of Belle Harbor: Home

Orthodox yeshivas in New York City